These are the official results of the Women's 4x100 metres event at the 1993 IAAF World Championships in Stuttgart, Germany. Their final was held on Sunday 1993-08-22.

Final

Heats
Held on Saturday 1993-08-21

Heat 1

Heat 2

See also
 1990 Women's European Championships 4 × 100 m Relay (Split)
 1991 Women's World Championships 4 × 100 m Relay (Tokyo)
 1992 Women's Olympic 4 × 100 m Relay (Barcelona)
 1994 Women's European Championships 4 × 100 m Relay (Helsinki)
 1995 Women's World Championships 4 × 100 m Relay (Gothenburg)

References
 Results

 
Relays at the World Athletics Championships
4 × 100 metres relay
1993 in women's athletics